Jeremy Marr Williams is an American.

Career

Filmography

Movies
Bobby Fischer Live (2009)
Troubadour (2010)
The Resistance (2011)
Redemption of the commons (2014)
Clowns (2014)
Genesis (2016)

TV series
Dry Creek: Americans first frontier (2014-2015)

References

External links

https://faithflixfilms.com/2014/10/08/jeremy-marr-williams-actor/

Year of birth missing (living people)
Living people
21st-century American male actors
Central Academy of Drama alumni
American male film actors